Gordon Stevenson, known as Baron Von Fancy for certain artistic and commercial purposes, is a multimedia artist who lives and works in New York City.

Background
Baron Von Fancy was born in New York City and attended Columbia Grammar and Preparatory School.  He earned his Bachelor in Fine Arts from Bard College in 2006.  Gordon Stevenson identifies himself by his birth name for his artwork displayed in galleries, and he uses the artistic name "Baron Von Fancy" to sign his work used for commercial products. For example, his lighters are signed Baron Von Fancy, whereas his paintings are signed with his birth name.

Work
Baron Von Fancy works in various media in addition to canvas.  He has applied his distinctive artistic sensibility to create a broad range of tangible, practical items such as sponges, doormats, socks, backpacks, lighters, bow ties, matchboxes, handbags, cell phone cases and shirts. Clever and enchanting at the same time, Von Fancy's work is light-hearted, playful or, at times, crude.

Collaborations
Von Fancy has collaborated with fashion, cosmetics and sportswear brands.  Among the brands that he has worked with are: Nike, Google, Amazon, Kith, NY Mets, Vans, Uber, Rag & Bone, Reece Hudson, Reformation, Bobbi Brown Cosmetics, Gitman Vintage, Smith Optics and MeUndies.  He is known for his originality and talent in matching an object with a humorous and memorable phrase. Larger retailers such as Urban Outfitters, Elizabeth Arden, Inc., Juicy Couture, Porsche Design Group, and Patagonia have collaborated with him on distinctive collections and projects. 

The mobile phone accessory company Incipio launched a line of iPhone cases featuring Baron's art in December 2017. In advance of the November 2016 launch of its new television series Good Behavior, TNT asked Von Fancy to design art and an installation, which was previewed at 29Rooms, promoting this new, edgy series.  Baron was featured as an artistic ambassador for Nike's and KITH's pop-up store in SoHo that opened in August 2016.  Later that Fall, he was retained by MOO, the London-based printer of custom business cards, to create five custom designs for a capsule collection of colorful, innovative business cards. Rogers & Cowan worked with Von Fancy in November 2016 to promote the American cotton industry's jeans recycling program.

In June 2018, Women's Wear Daily reported that New York City-based legwear firm Fun Socks! would collaborate with Von Fancy on a line of socks for F/W 18. On January 1, 2016, Vans launched a collections of sneakers featuring Baron Von Fancy's designs.  In Fall 2015, Von Fancy provided visuals for the launch of the Louis Vuitton Windows book, published by Assouline.  That Summer, Converse selected Baron Von Fancy (among other artists) for social media promotion of its Chuck Taylor All-Star II, the first changes to Converse's highly successful line of sneakers in nearly a century. In his signature typeface, Von Fancy prepared several phrases for display on Converse's Twitter page, including "Can't Wait," "What's Next?", and "Ready for More."

For Valentine's Day 2015, Kreemart presented an exhibition of his work at Melissa Galerie's SoHo store. Paperless Post launched a collaboration with Baron on Valentine's Day 2014, featuring his greeting cards, invitations and Valentine's Day cards.

Billboards and public work
For the past five years, Baron Von Fancy has displayed his art on billboards in the SoHo neighborhood and elsewhere in his native New York City.  Billboards featuring playful and charming expressions such as "On my way to steal your girl," "Don't call me baby," "Never not working," and "May the bridges I burn light the way," among others, have greeted New Yorkers in Manhattan and its environs as they look skyward since at least 2013. 

In May 2016, his billboard featuring the edgy phrase "If you're feeling down, I can feel you up" was posted in lower Manhattan at the intersection of Canal and West Broadway.

In the Summer of 2013, his "I Can't Grow Up" mural was displayed on a billboard on Orchard Street in the Lower East Side.

In October 2013, for its 125th anniversary celebration, Katz's Delicatessen invited Baron to contribute a work to their pop-up art gallery housed next to the deli.  The result, a ten-foot high mural of "I'll Have What She's Having," referenced When Harry Met Sally...'s legendary fake-orgasm scene that had been shot at the deli.

Murals with some of Baron Von Fancy's signature phrases were shown in Paris at Colette, in "A Thing Called Love," a show that opened in February 2013.

Exhibitions and multimedia art
Since 2006, his work has been displayed around the world with exhibitions in California, New York, Florida, at Ochi Gallery in Idaho, as well as in Rhode Island, Iowa, and France.  In August 2015, The Tripoli Gallery presented his exhibition "Never Say Goodbye," of paintings that humorously comment on romantic relationships, featuring cartoon characters such as Casper the Friendly Ghost and Jiminy Cricket. Previously, in Spring 2014, The Tripoli Gallery presented an exhibition of his original paintings entitled "I Remember It Differently," which featured paintings of Archie and Disney animated films.
 
Colette invited Baron Von Fancy to create "A Thing Called Love," a show held at their flagship location in Paris and featured a range of his artwork.  Von Fancy has created sculpture using electroluminescent wire, a fresh medium ideal for explorations of the effects of color. His fascination with color interaction has also been manifested through a number of "water projects," in which he and his collaborators add multicolored dyes to fountains, rivers, etc. for public display.

Origin of the name
The artistic name evolved from his college nickname "Fancy-pants," which itself had originated from his collection of vintage Versace jeans. Baron Von Fancy also is known for other of his numerous collections which include homemade prison artifacts, pre-9/11 Twin Towers ephemera, and peep show sex tokens.

Phrases
A hallmark of Baron Von Fancy's signature style is the use of common, English language phrases. In some cases, the words are highlighted with a bright color, such as green, pink or yellow.  Von Fancy's critics have exercised considerable verbal talent in elaborating on these simple words, even going so far as to describe them (with no intentional hyperbole or irony) as "poignant," "playful," "clever," "oscillat[ing] from colloquial to profound," "bold," "poetic," and "reminiscent of the classic, hand-painted billboards that populated New York in the 1950s and 1960s."

References

American multimedia artists
American fashion designers
Bard College alumni
1984 births
Living people